The College of Allied Health Sciences is a college at East Carolina University.  The school comprises all allied health majors except those offered by the College of Nursing.

External links

East Carolina University divisions
Health sciences schools in the United States